Tarkovsky is a Russian surname of Dagestani (Kumyk) and also Polish origin. The feminine form is Tarkovskaya. This surname may refer to:
Arseny Tarkovsky (1907–1989), a Russian poet and translator, father of Andrei Tarkovsky
Andrei Tarkovsky (1932–1986), a Russian filmmaker
Irina Tarkovskaya (born 1938), aka Irma Raush, a Russian actress and director, first wife of Andrei Tarkovsky
Mikhail Tarkovsky (born 1958), a Russian writer, poet, cinematographer, and professional hunter, nephew of Andrei Tarkovsky
Nuh-bey Tarkovsky

See also
 
 Tarkowski, a Polish surname
 3345 Tarkovskij, an asteroid named after Andrei Tarkovsky

References